The National Mission for Manuscripts (NAMAMI) is an autonomous organisation under Ministry of Culture, Government of India, established to survey, locate and conserve Indian manuscripts, with an aim to create  national resource base for manuscripts, for enhancing their access, awareness and use for educational purposes. The Mission was initiated in February 2003, by the Ministry of Tourism and Culture, Government of India and Indira Gandhi National Centre for the Arts (IGNCA) is the nodal agency for the execution of this project. It  creates bibliographic databases of Indian manuscripts and is involved in the conservation and preservation of the manuscripts.

Overview
The organisation works in the field of restoration and conservation Indian manuscripts, and their digitisation, to promote access and scholarship through research and publication. It  has also established a national network of institutions and manuscript repositories, including Manuscript Resource Centres (MRC-s), Manuscript Conservation Centres (MCC-s), Manuscript Partner Centres (MPC-s) and Manuscript Conservation Partner Centres (MCPC-s), spread across the nation. It has also established Kritisampada, the National Database of Manuscripts, a digital archive at its website.

The Mission also got a Rigveda manuscripts preserved at the Bhandarkar Oriental Research Institute, Pune, where it runs a 'Manuscripts Resource and Conservation Centre', included in UNESCO’S, Memory of the World Register in 2007.  In October 2010, the Sayaji Rao Gaekwad Library (Central Library), BHU in association with the Mission, held a national workshop on manuscript conservation at the library.

Manuscript Conservation Centres (MCCs)
The Mission runs a network of 32 conservation units across the India, known as Manuscript Conservation Centres (MCCs), divided according to geographical zones.

North
 Central Institute of Buddhist Studies, Leh
 Indira Gandhi National Centre for the Arts (IGNCA), New Delhi
 Department of Language and Culture, Shimla
 The Himalayan Society for Heritage and Art Conservation, Nainital
 Vrindavan Research Institute, Vrindavan
 Rampur Raza Library, Rampur
 Nagarjuna Buddhist Foundation, Gorakhpur
 Indian Conservation Institute, Lucknow
 Visweshvarananda Biswabandhu Institute of Sanskrit and Indological Studies, Hoshiarpur
 Central Library, Banaras Hindu University, Banaras

South
 Oriental Research Institute, Sri Venkateswara University, Tirupati
 Salar Jung Museum, Hyderabad, Telangana
 INTACH Chitrakala Parishath Art Conservation Centre, Bangalore, Karnataka
 Tamil Nadu Government Museum, Chennai, Tamil Nadu
 Karnataka State Archives, Bangalore, Karnataka
 Tanjore Maharaja Serfoji's Saraswati Mahal Library, Thanjavur, Tamil Nadu
 Centre for Heritage Studies Hill Palace Museum, Thripunithura, Kerala
 Regional Conservation Laboratory, Thiruvananthapuram, Kerala
 State Archives and Research Institute, Hyderabad, Telangana

East
 Khuda Bakhsh Oriental Public Library, Patna
 Sarasvati, Bhadrak 
 Sri Dev Kumar Jain Oriental research Institute, Arrah
 Manuscript Library, University of Calcutta, Kolkata, West Bengal
 INTACH Orissa Art Conservation Centre, Bhubaneswar, Odisha
 AITIHYA, Bhubaneswar, Odisha
 Sambalpur University, Burla, Odisha
 Krishna Kanta Handiqui Library, Gauhati University, Guwahati, Assam
 Manipur State Archives, Imphal, Manipur
 Tawang Monastery, Tawang, Arunachal Pradesh

West
 Rajasthan Oriental Research Institute, Jodhpur
 Mahaveer Digamber Jain Pandulipi Samrakshan Kendra, Jaipur, Rajasthan
 Lalbhai Dalpatbhai Institute of Indology, Ahmedabad, Gujarat
 Bhandarkar Oriental Research Institute (BORI), Pune, Maharashtra

Central
 Scindia Oriental Research Institute (SORI), Ujjain

Manuscript Studies
 Basic Level Courses on Manuscriptology and Palaeography
 Advanced Level Workshop on Manuscriptology and Palaeography
 Research Fellowships (Gurukula Fellowships)

References

External links 
 Official Website of National Mission for Manuscripts
 Bharatiya Kriti Sampada, the National Database of Manuscripts

Historiography of India
Manuscripts
Government agencies established in 2003
Organisations based in Delhi
Government agencies of India
Heritage organizations
Indology
Archives in India
2003 establishments in Delhi
Indian missions